James Devins (born 20 September 1948) is a former Irish Fianna Fáil politician and medical doctor. He served as a Teachta Dála (TD) from 2002 to 2011.

Early and personal life
Devins is a medical doctor by profession, and worked as a GP in Sligo town from 1975. His grandfather James Devins served a Sinn Féin TD for Sligo–Mayo East from 1921 to 1922. He is married to Judge Mary Devins.

Career
Devins was elected to Sligo County Council in 1991 and re-elected in 1999. He was first elected to Dáil Éireann at the 2002 general election for the Sligo–Leitrim constituency. At the 2007 general election, he was elected for the Sligo–North Leitrim constituency.

In July 2007, legislation was passed to increase the number of Ministers of State from 17 to 20, and Devins was nominated by Bertie Ahern to be appointed by the government to be Minister of State at the Departments of Health and Children, Education and Science, Enterprise, Trade and Employment and Justice, Equality and Law Reform, with special responsibility for disability issues and mental health, excluding discrimination.

In May 2008, Brian Cowen succeeded Ahern as Taoiseach, and nominated Devins to be appointed by the government to be Minister of State at the Departments of Enterprise, Trade and Employment, and Education and Science, with special responsibility for science, technology and innovation. In April 2009, Cowen sought the resignation of all Ministers of State in order to reduce the number from 20 to 15. Devins was not one of those reappointed.

On 5 August 2009, Devins (along with fellow Fianna Fáil TD Eamon Scanlon) resigned the party whip over his opposition to cuts in services at Sligo General Hospital. He stated that he would remain a member of the Fianna Fáil party. He rejoined the Fianna Fáil parliamentary party on 25 January 2011, a day before the leadership election.

Devins did not contest the 2011 general election.

See also
Families in the Oireachtas

References

	

1948 births
Living people
Alumni of University College Dublin
Alumni of Trinity College Dublin
Fianna Fáil TDs
Irish general practitioners
Local councillors in County Sligo
Members of the 29th Dáil
Members of the 30th Dáil
Ministers of State of the 30th Dáil